Via Darjeeling is a 2008 Indian Hindi thriller drama film directed by debutant Arindam Nandy. It stars Kay Kay Menon, Sonali Kulkarni, Vinay Pathak, Sandhya Mridul and Rajat Kapoor as the lead protagonists.

Plot
The film revolves around the story of a honeymooning couple Ankur and Rimli who are very much in love. On the day of their departure from Darjeeling, Ankur disappears mysteriously leaving Rimli all alone frantically searching for him. Here enters the policeman Robin Dutt who tries to trace Ankur, but in vain. The story then moves onto a group of friends partying and having a good time, where Robin who is one of the guests narrates the story of Ankur and Rimli to his friends. How each one of them make their own interpretations as to what happened to Ankur makes the movie an interesting watch.

Cast
Kay Kay Menon as Ankur Sharma
Parvin Dabbas as Bonny/Rahul
Prashant Narayanan as Kaushik Chatterjee
Rajat Kapoor as Ronodeep Sen
Simone Singh as Preeti Sen
Sandhya Mridul as Mallika Tiwari
Sonali Kulkarni as Rimli Sharma/Sangeeta
Vinay Pathak as Inspector Robin Dutt
Rupam Islam as a Bar Singer at Darjeeling

Soundtrack 
The music of this film was composed by Prabudhha Benerjee. This album features 10 tracks, sung by reputed singers like K.S.Chithra, Shaan, Sunidhi Chauhan & Kunal Ganjawala. The album consists of 6 songs and 4 instrumentals based on the theme for portraying characters in the film.

References

External links
 

2008 films
2000s Hindi-language films
Films set in Darjeeling
Indian thriller drama films